Ueli Wiget (born 1957 in Winterthur) is a Swiss pianist, harpsichordist and harpist.

He was prized at the 1985 Sydney Competition. Since 1986 Wiget is a member of the Ensemble Modern, a chair he combines with an international concert career.

References
 Ensemble Modern
 Ruhr Trienniale
   Calouste Gulbenkian Foundation
 BBC National Orchestra of Wales
 ArkivMusic - Discography
 Centro para la Difusión de la Música Contemporánea (Spain)
 The Independent
 El Mundo
   Mundoclásico
 BBC Music Magazine
 Rechenzentrum
 
 
 The New York Times
 Schön Musik

External links
 Deconstructive performance of Ludwig van Beethoven's 5th Piano Concerto

Living people
1957 births
Swiss classical pianists
Contemporary classical music performers
Sydney International Piano Competition prize-winners
People from Winterthur
Swiss harpsichordists
21st-century classical pianists